Two Boots is a chain of pizzerias based in New York City. The pizzeria chain is owned by the Hartman family, who was inspired by New Orleans ingredients and New Haven-style pizza. Two Boots locations are colorful and artistic, including elements and art from the surrounding neighborhood.

Attributes
The chain is owned by Phil Hartman and his son Leon, and is named after the boot-shaped country of Italy and US state of Louisiana. The chain is inspired by New Orleans with Cajun ingredients and New Haven foods, and by East Village with its eccentric ambiance. The pizza is directly inspired by New Haven-style pizza, with cornmeal embedded in its crust.

Each location has its own distinctive characteristics, incorporating elements of the neighborhood, with artist commissions for murals, mosaics, and sculptures to feature in an individual pizzeria. As well, each location has a unique menu item that pays homage to its community; for example, the Hogwallop pie in the Park Slope, Brooklyn location was named after a character in the film O Brother, Where Art Thou?, played by Park Slope resident John Turturro.

In March 2020, Two Boots was included in Forbes  15 Of The Best Food Delivery Options In Manhattan.

History
In 1987, Phil Hartman opened the first location along with his ex-wife Doris Kornish and real estate developer John Touhey. They opened in a part of East Village in Manhattan, a neighborhood known for its drug-dealing at the time. The chain slowly grew around Manhattan. By 2017, the business had 15 locations.

References

Sources
 NEIGHBORHOOD REPORT: EAST VILLAGE; 2 Pillars of Neo-Punk Life: Art and Pizza
 TEMPTATION; So Who Needs Cheese? Just Add a Spicy Sauce
 Neighbors Just Say 'No' to Pizza
 It Takes an East Village
 On Avenue A, a Video Store Fires Smiles at an Edgy Rival

External links

 

Grand Central Terminal
Pizzerias in New York City
Pizza chains of the United States
Restaurants in New York City
Restaurants established in 1987
1987 establishments in New York City